Mririda n'Ait Attik (in Amazigh : Mririda n Ayt Atiq) (c. 1900 – c. 1940s) was a Berber Moroccan Shilha poet writing in Tashelhit. She was born in Megdaz in the Tassaout valley. Her poems were put to paper and translated into French in the 1930s by René Euloge. Euloge was a French civil servant based in Asilah since 1927.

Little is known about her life. Born in the village of Megdaz, in the Tassaout valley, Mririda married at a very early age, but soon fled her unhappy life at home to become an itinerant oral poet and performer. She toured from market to market, improvising and performing her poetry, which she composed in Tashelhit.

Mririda was the pen name she used on stage, and her real name is unknown. She was illiterate and never committed her poems to paper. Her poetry dealt with tabu topics at the time (particularly coming from a woman poet), such as divorce, household problems, and unrequited love.

During the 1940s, she is said to have been a courtesan in the souk (marketplace) in Azilal, and was famed for the songs she sang to the men who visited her house. By the end of WWII, Mririda had disappeared. No one knows when or where she died.

Books

Poetry collections 

 Les Chants de la Tassaout de Mririda N’aït Attik (1959, tr. René Euloge)
 Songs of Mririda by Mririda n’Ait Attik (1974, translated from Euloge’s version in French by Daniel Halpern and Paula Paley)
 Tassawt Voices, by Mririda n-Ayt Attiq and René Euloge (2001, translated from Euloge’s version in French by Michael Peyron)

Anthologies 

 Bending the Bow: an anthology of African love poetry, ed. Frank M. Chipasula (2009)
 Mririda N’Ait Atiq: The Brooch (poem)
 The Penguin Book of Women Poets, ed. Carol Cosman, Joan Keefe, and Kathleen Weaver (1978)
 Mririda N’Ait Atiq: God hasn’t made room (poem)

Bibliography
Les Chants de la Tassaout de Mririda N'aït Attik, trad. René Euloge, Maroc Editions, 1972  
Haddad, Lahcen. "Engaging Patriarchy and Oral Tradition: Mririda N'Ait Attik or the Gendered Subaltern's Strategies of Appropriation and Deconstruction", in: Le Discours sur la Femme Ed. Fouzia Ghissassi, Rabat: Publications de la Faculté des Lettres et des Sciences Humaines, n° 65.
Tassawt Voices, by Mririda n-Ayt Attiq and René Euloge, translated by Michael Peyron, AUI Press, Ifrane  2008

External links
Texts in French and photo of n'Ait Attik 
Fragment sung by Hayet Ayad

References

1900s births
1940s deaths
Berber poets
Berber Moroccans
Berber writers
20th-century Moroccan poets
Moroccan women writers
Year of birth missing
People from Béni Mellal-Khénifra
Moroccan women poets
20th-century Moroccan women writers